SWIPE is a free-print magazine. Launched in May 2016, SWIPE targets millennials (18 - 34 year olds) in London by distributing the magazine at tube stations and in selected offices, co-working spaces and cafes. 20,000 copies are distributed every fortnight and contributors include online brands like Business Insider, CityLab and Wikihow. SWIPE was founded by Tom Rendell and Barney Guiton and includes a young editorial team formerly of The Times, The Independent and Newsweek.

References

Local interest magazines published in the United Kingdom
Biweekly magazines published in the United Kingdom
Free magazines
Magazines published in London
Magazines established in 2016
Youth magazines